Pancheshwar is a village development committee in Baitadi District in the Mahakali Zone of western Nepal. At the time of the 1991 Nepal census it had a population of 2,951 and had 510 houses in the village. It is located at the confluence of Sarju and Kali.

References

Populated places in Baitadi District